Frederico Gil and Florin Mergea were the defending champions, however Gil chose to not participate this year.
Mergea partnered up with Denis Istomin, but they lost to Rubén Ramírez Hidalgo and Santiago Ventura in the semifinal.

Seeds

Draw

Draw

External links
 Main Draw

2009,Doubles
Marrakech,Doubles